The Cape Breton Regional Municipality is a single municipality. This is a list of unincorporated areas within it, some of which are former municipalities, and some of which correspond to census areas. Estimated populations from the 2001 census are in parentheses. CBRM 2001 population was 109,330.

Communities

References
 CBRM population map